David "Honeyboy" Edwards (June 28, 1915 – August 29, 2011) was a Delta blues guitarist and singer from Mississippi.

Biography
Edwards was born in Shaw, Mississippi. He learned to play music from his father, a guitarist and violinist. At the age of 14, he left home to travel with the bluesman Big Joe Williams, beginning life as an itinerant musician, which he maintained through the 1930s and 1940s. He performed with the famed blues musician Robert Johnson, with whom he developed a close friendship. Edwards was present on the night Johnson drank the poisoned whiskey that killed him, and his story has become the definitive version of Johnson's demise. Edwards also knew and played with other leading bluesmen in the Mississippi Delta, including Charley Patton, Tommy Johnson, and Johnny Shines.  
He described the itinerant bluesman's life:

The folklorist Alan Lomax recorded Edwards in Clarksdale, Mississippi, in 1942 for the Library of Congress. Edwards recorded 15 album sides of music, including his songs "Wind Howlin' Blues" and "The Army Blues". He did not record commercially until 1951, when he recorded "Who May Be Your Regular Be" for Arc under the name Mr. Honey. Edwards claimed to have written several well-known blues songs, including "Long Tall Woman Blues" and "Just Like Jesse James." His discography for the 1950s and 1960s amounts to nine songs from seven sessions. From 1974 to 1977, he recorded tracks for his first full-length LP, I've Been Around, released in 1978 by the independent label Trix Records and produced by the ethnomusicologist Peter B. Lowry. Kansas City Red played for Edwards for a brief period, and Earwig recorded them in 1981, along with Sunnyland Slim and Floyd Jones, for the album Old Friends Together for the First Time.

His autobiography, The World Don't Owe Me Nothing: The Life and Times of Delta Bluesman Honeyboy Edwards, published in 1997 by the Chicago Review Press, recounts his life from childhood, his travels through the American South, and his arrival in Chicago in the early 1950s. A companion CD with the same title was released by Earwig Music. His long association with the Earwig label and with his manager, Michael Frank, led to several late-career albums on various independent labels from the 1980s on. He also recorded at a church turned recording studio in Salina, Kansas, and released albums on the APO label. Edwards continued the rambling life he described in his autobiography, touring well into his 90s.

Between 1996 and 2000, he was nominated for eight W. C. Handy/Blues Music Awards, including for his albums White Windows, The World Don't Owe Me Nothin''', Mississippi Delta Blues Man, and a 2007 album on which he appears with Robert Lockwood Jr., Henry Townsend and Pinetop Perkins titled Last of the Great Mississippi Delta Bluesmen: Live In Dallas. The latter album won a Grammy Award in 2008. He also won the W. C. Handy Blues Award in 2005 and the Blues Music Award in 2007 for Acoustic Blues Artist. In 2010, he received a Grammy Lifetime Achievement Award.

On July 17, 2011, Frank announced that Edwards would retire because of ill health.

Edwards died of congestive heart failure at his home on August 29, 2011, at about 3 a.m. According to events listings on the Metromix Chicago website, he had been scheduled to perform at noon that day, at the Jay Pritzker Pavilion in Chicago's Millennium Park.

Discography

 "Build a Cave"/"Who May Be Your Regular Be" (ARC, 1951)
 "Drop Down Mama" (Chess, 1953)
 I've Been Around (Trix Records, 1978, 1995)Mississippi Delta Bluesman (Folkways Records, 1979)
 Old Friends (Earwig, 1979)
 White Windows (Blue Suit, 1988)
 Delta Bluesman (Earwig/Indigo, 1992)
 Crawling Kingsnake (Testament, 1997)
 World Don't Owe Me Nothing, recorded live (Earwig, 1997)
 Don't Mistreat a Fool (Genes, 1999)
 Shake 'Em On Down (APO, 2000)
 Mississippi Delta Bluesman (reissue of 1979 album: Smithsonian Folkways Records, 2001)
 Back to the Roots (Wolf, 2001)
 Roamin' and Ramblin (Earwig, 2008)

Film
In the 1991 documentary The Search for Robert Johnson, Edwards recounts stories about Johnson, including his murder.

Edwards is the subject of the 2010 award-winning film Honeyboy and the History of the Blues, from Free Range Studios, directed by Scott Taradash. The film features stories of his life from picking cotton as a sharecropper to traveling the world performing his music. Artists who appear in the film include Keith Richards, Robert Cray, Joe Perry, Lucinda Williams, B. B. King, Big Joe Williams, and Ace Atkins.

Edwards appeared in the 2007 film Walk Hard: The Dewey Cox Story.

Awards and honors

1996: Induction into the Blues Hall of Fame
1998: Keeping the Blues Alive Award in literature, for The World Don't Owe Me Nothing1999: Blues Hall of Fame inductee, Classics of Blues Literature, for The World Don't Owe Me Nothing2002: National Heritage Fellowship, National Endowment for the Arts
2005: Acoustic Blues Artist of the Year, 26th W. C. Handy Blues Awards
2007: Acoustic Blues Artist of the Year, 28th Blues Music Award
2008: Grammy Award, Best Traditional Blues Album, for Last of the Great Mississippi Delta Bluesmen: Live In Dallas''
2010: Grammy Lifetime Achievement Award
2010: Mississippi Governor's Award for Excellence in the Arts
2010: Lifetime Achievement Award, National Guitar Museum

See also
Crossroads Guitar Festival
Dockery Plantation
List of blues musicians
List of Delta blues musicians
Mississippi Blues Trail
Notodden Blues Festival

References

External links

1915 births
2011 deaths
Country blues musicians
American blues singers
American blues guitarists
American male guitarists
Blues musicians from Mississippi
People from Shaw, Mississippi
Delta blues musicians
National Heritage Fellowship winners
Slide guitarists
Writers from Mississippi
Grammy Lifetime Achievement Award winners
American male film actors
Singers from Chicago
Guitarists from Chicago
Guitarists from Mississippi
20th-century American guitarists
Earwig Music artists
African-American guitarists
20th-century African-American male singers